Arna's Children is a 2004 Dutch-Israeli documentary film directed by Juliano Mer Khamis  and Danniel Danniel. The film's story revolves around a children's theater group in Jenin in the Palestinian territories established by Arna Mer-Khamis, the director's mother, an Israeli Jewish political and human rights activist.

The film portrays the lives of Arna Mer-Khamis and the children members of the theater including Ala el-Sabagr, Zakaria Zubeidi, Daud Zubeidi, Majdi Shadi, Haifa Staiti, Nidal Swetti, Yussef Swetti, Mahmoud Kaneri, Khairia Fakhri and Ashraf Abu-Alheji.

The film won "Best Documentary Feature" in the 2004 Tribeca Film Festival.

Three of the theater children died in various operations or while resisting the Israeli army, namely Ala, Nidal, and Ashraf. Yussef committed a suicide attack in Hadera in 2001, murdering four civilians. Two other children, Daud and Zakaria were imprisoned.

The director of the film Juliano Mer Khamis was assassinated in Jenin on 4 April 2011 by masked militants.

References

External links
 Film website
Culture Unplugged
 

2004 films
2000s Arabic-language films
2000s Hebrew-language films
Documentary films about the Israeli–Palestinian conflict
Israeli independent films
Dutch independent films
2004 documentary films
Children's theatre
Participant (company) films
2004 independent films
2004 multilingual films
Israeli multilingual films
Dutch multilingual films